Espérance Football Club is an association football club based in Kigali, Rwanda. They currently compete in the Rwanda National Football League, and play their home games at the Stade Mumena.

References

External links
Soccerway

Football clubs in Rwanda